Territorial Army may refer to:

 Territorial Army (India)
 Territorial Army (United Kingdom)
 Territorial Army (Ethiopia), part of the Ethiopian National Defense Force
 Territorial Army (Germany) part of the West German Army during the Cold War
 Rejimen Askar Wataniah, Malaysia

See also
 Militia
 Territorial Defense (disambiguation)